The Tugulu Group is a geological Group in Xinjiang, China whose strata date back to the Early Cretaceous. Dinosaur skeletal remains and footprints are among the fossils that have been recovered from the formation.

Vertebrate paleofauna

Dinosaurs

Pterosaurs

Pseudosuchians

Fish

References

Bibliography 
 

Geologic groups of Asia
Geologic formations of China
Lower Cretaceous Series of Asia
Cretaceous China
Paleontology in Xinjiang